Bertha "Chippie" Hill (March 15, 1905 – May 7, 1950), was an American blues and vaudeville singer and dancer, best known for her recordings with Louis Armstrong.

Career
Hill was born in Charleston, South Carolina, one of sixteen children. The family moved to New York in 1915. She began her career as a dancer in Harlem and by 1919 was working with Ethel Waters. At age 14, during a stint at Leroy's, a noted New York nightclub, Hill was nicknamed "Chippie" because of her youth. She also performed with Ma Rainey as part of the Rabbit Foot Minstrels. She later established her own song and dance act and toured on the TOBA circuit in the early 1920s.

About 1925, she settled in Chicago, where she worked at various venues with King Oliver's Jazz Band.  She first recorded in November 1925 for Okeh Records, backed by the cornet player Louis Armstrong and the pianist Richard M. Jones, singing such songs as "Pratt City Blues", "Low Land Blues" and "Kid Man Blues" that year and "Georgia Man" and "Trouble in Mind" with the same musicians in 1926. She also recorded in 1927, with Lonnie Johnson on the vocal duet "Hard Times Blues", plus "Weary Money Blues", "Tell Me Why" and "Speedway Blues". In 1928, she recorded vocal duets with Tampa Red, singing "Hard Times Blues", "Christmas Man Blues", and another version of "Trouble in Mind" for Vocalion. In 1929 she recorded "Non-Skid Tread" with "Scrapper" Blackwell and the Two Roys, with Leroy Carr on piano. Hill recorded 23 titles between 1925 and 1929.

In the 1930s she retired from singing to raise her seven children. Hill staged a comeback in 1946 with Lovie Austin's Blues Serenaders, and recorded for Rudi Blesh's Circle label. She began appearing on radio and in clubs and concerts in New York, including in 1948 the Carnegie Hall concert with Kid Ory, and she sang at the Paris Jazz Festival, and worked with Art Hodes in Chicago.

She was back again in 1950, when she was run over by a car and killed in New York at the age of 45. She is buried at the Lincoln Cemetery, Blue Island, Illinois.

Selected discography

References

External links
[ Allmusic: Bertha "Chippie" Hill biography]
Bertha "Chippie" Hill (1905-1950) Red Hot Jazz Archive

1905 births
1950 deaths
Vaudeville performers
American female dancers
Dancers from South Carolina
Classic female blues singers
Musicians from Charleston, South Carolina
20th-century American singers
20th-century American women singers
20th-century American dancers